Ashok Omprakash Malhotra  (born 26 January 1957) is a former Indian cricketer who played in seven Test matches and 20 One Day Internationals from 1982 to 1986. He used to be the highest scorer in Ranji Trophy at one time. He was also said to be the next Viswanath in Indian cricket. In the early 1990s, he was an overseas professional at Dunfermline Cricket Club in Fife, Scotland. During his time in Fife he became a big fan of Dunfermline Athletic FC. He has opened a cricket coaching centre namely Ashok Malhotra Cricket Academy which has around 300 students. He is one of the very few level 3 coaches in India.

A Level III coach, Malhotra briefly coached Team India in an acting capacity after John Wright had had to return to New Zealand.

On 22 July 2013, Malhotra was named coach of the Bengal senior cricket team.

References

1957 births
Living people
India Test cricketers
India One Day International cricketers
Indian cricketers
North Zone cricketers
East Zone cricketers
Bengal cricketers
Haryana cricketers
Cricketers from Amritsar
Indian cricket coaches
India national cricket team selectors
Indian cricket commentators